"Rock O' My Soul", also known as "Rock My Soul", "Bosom of Abraham" or "Rocka My Soul", is a traditional African American spiritual. It was first documented by William Francis Allen, in the 1867 collection Slave Songs of the United States.  Allen attributed the origin of the song to the state of Virginia and documented the following lyrics:

One of the earliest recorded version was made in 1937 by the Heavenly Gospel Singers. Notable artists who have recorded the song include the Jordanaires, Louis Armstrong, Lonnie Donegan, Peter Paul & Mary and Elvis Presley.

Alvin Ailey made "Rocka My Soul in the Bosom of Abraham" the music for the triumphant finale of his internationally known choreography Revelations, which was born out of the choreographer's "blood memories" of his childhood in rural Texas and attending the Baptist Church with his mother.  It was also performed as a tribute at his 1989 funeral at the Cathedral of St. John the Divine. Israeli dancer and choreographer Nadav Zelner used "Rocka My Soul in the Bosom of Abraham" as music for a clip for his student dance troupe.

References

External links
 Library of Congress, recording of Rich Brown singing "Rocky My Soul" unaccompanied. Recorded by John Lomax, 1940.
 Library of Congress recording of "Rock My Soul in the Bosom of Abraham" by an unidentified vocal quartet.  Fort Valley, Georgia, 1941.

African-American spiritual songs
American Christian hymns
Elvis Presley songs
Peter, Paul and Mary songs